Patterson Johnson (born 26 August 1964) is a Bahamian athlete. He competed in the men's triple jump at the 1988 Summer Olympics.

References

1964 births
Living people
Athletes (track and field) at the 1988 Summer Olympics
Bahamian male triple jumpers
Olympic athletes of the Bahamas
Place of birth missing (living people)